"100 Hours", a joint production between TVNZ and the Netherlands' IDTV, was a New Zealand television show filmed in Avalon, New Zealand that aired on TV2 on Sunday evenings in 2002. The show was hosted by Evie Ashton. There were around two thousand applicants nationwide for the show.

Format 
Four contestants were locked in an underground bunker in a secret location with no timepieces. The contestants were required to have to learn a series of challenges, which included mind, body and dexterity types. They faced off against the others until one of them won and went on to a final. The ultimate prize of the show was a Mini Cooper.
There was also an element of strategising and bluffing, as contestants attempted to gain psychological advantage.

References 

2002 New Zealand television series debuts
New Zealand reality television series